Luciano Vitullo (born 3 February 1983) is an Argentine former professional tennis player.

A native of Carapachay, Vitullo had a promising junior career and was taken under the wing of Paul Annacone, coach of Pete Sampras. He won the Eddie Herr International Junior Championships in 2000 and made the US Open junior semi-finals in 2001. As a doubles player he claimed a junior title at the 2001 Australian Open, partnering Ytai Abougzir.

Vitullo reached a best singles world ranking of 440 and won two ITF Futures titles.

ITF Futures finals

Singles: 5 (2–3)

Doubles: 4 (2–2)

References

External links
 
 

1983 births
Living people
Argentine male tennis players
Australian Open (tennis) junior champions
Grand Slam (tennis) champions in boys' doubles
Sportspeople from Buenos Aires Province
People from Vicente López Partido